Luther Lee Bohanon (August 9, 1902 – July 18, 2003) was a United States district judge of the United States District Court for the Eastern District of Oklahoma, the United States District Court for the Northern District of Oklahoma and the United States District Court for the Western District of Oklahoma.

Education and career

Bohanon was born on August 9, 1902, in Fort Smith, Arkansas, to William and Artelia Hickman Bohanon. His family moved to Stigler, Oklahoma, four years later. Another move took the family of 14 children to Kinta, Oklahoma where he completed his elementary education. He completed his high school education at Muskogee, Oklahoma. Bohanon received a Bachelor of Laws in 1927 from the University of Oklahoma College of Law. He was an assistant county attorney for Seminole County, Oklahoma in Seminole, Oklahoma from 1927 to 1928. He entered private practice in Seminole and Oklahoma City, Oklahoma from 1928 to 1936, then solely in Oklahoma City from 1936 to 1961. Bohanon was partnered with Alfred P. Murrah during his entire law service at the law firm of Murrah & Bohanon, with their two most notable clients being Armand Hammer and Howard Hughes. Bohanon also worked with oilman Robert S. Kerr to elect Leon Phillips as governor. Their friendship continued thereafter. He also became a friend of Kerr's brother, Aubrey. In 1961, when Bohanan was being considered for another appointment, the ABA said that he was unqualified. Attorney General Robert F. Kennedy, who was not a friend of the Kerrs, had the nomination stalled in the U. S. Senate. Kerr, in turn, stalled certain legislation in the Senate that the Kennedy Administration considered critical. The stalemate was eventually broken and Bohanon received his appointment. He resigned his ABA membership and never rejoined. 

Bohanon was the bankruptcy trustee for Selected Investments, where his work uncovered evidence of corruption at the Oklahoma Supreme Court. He also represented the Otoe-Missouria tribe in a case that allowed them to sue for the fair value of their aboriginal lands.  He served in the United States Army Air Corps as a Major in the JAG Corps from 1942 to 1945.

Federal judicial service

After a recommendation by future Oklahoma United States Senator Robert S. Kerr, Bohanon was nominated by President John F. Kennedy on August 18, 1961, to a joint seat on the United States District Court for the Eastern District of Oklahoma, the United States District Court for the Northern District of Oklahoma and the United States District Court for the Western District of Oklahoma vacated by Judge William Robert Wallace. He was confirmed by the United States Senate on August 30, 1961, and received his commission on August 30, 1961. He served as Chief Judge of the Western District from 1969 to 1972. He assumed senior status on August 2, 1974. His service terminated on July 18, 2003, due to his death.

Notable cases

Bohanon presided over two important civil rights cases: Battle v. Oklahoma which resulted in the State being ordered to implement procedures for the humane treatment of prison inmates; and Dowell v. Oklahoma City Board of Education, requiring the racial desegregation of the Oklahoma City schools.

Personal

Bohanon was active in Democratic Party affairs on the local, state and national levels. He was a member of the Democratic Party's National Convention platform committee in 1940. He was a Mason and a Shriner and a member of the United Methodist Church of Nichols Hills, Oklahoma. He married Marie Swatek in July 1933. They had four children. One son, Richard L. Bohanon, became a United States bankruptcy judge in Oklahoma City. The other children died either in infancy or very early childhood. Both Bohanon's were buried in Fairlawn Cemetery in Oklahoma City.

Notes

References

Other sources
 "Luther Bohanon", Vertical File, Research Division, Oklahoma Historical Society, Oklahoma City, Oklahoma.
 "Luther Bohanon", Vertical File, Oklahoma Room, Oklahoma Department of Libraries, Oklahoma City, Oklahoma.
 Daily Oklahoman (Oklahoma City), 18 April 1999 and 31 October 2001.
 Kenny A. Franks and Paul F. Lambert, The Legacy of Dean Julien C. Monnet: Judge Luther Bohanon and the Desegregation of Oklahoma City's Public Schools (Muskogee, Okla.: Western Heritage Books, 1983).
 Jace Weaver, Then to the Rock Let Me Fly: Luther Bohanon and Judicial Activism (Norman: University of Oklahoma Press, 1993).

External links

 Encyclopedia of Oklahoma History and Culture - Bohanon, Luther Lee (1902–2003)
 

1902 births
2003 deaths
American centenarians
Men centenarians
People from Fort Smith, Arkansas
People from Stigler, Oklahoma
People from Seminole, Oklahoma
University of Oklahoma alumni
Judges of the United States District Court for the Eastern District of Oklahoma
United States district court judges appointed by John F. Kennedy
20th-century American judges
People from Haskell County, Oklahoma